David Morley (born 6 August 1965) is an English former child actor, most notably featured in Stanley Kubrick's Barry Lyndon.

Morley was born in London on 6 August 1965. He now lives in Belgium, where he works as an electronic musician and producer. He was the in-house engineer for R&S Records in the 1980s and 1990s. He worked with DJ Andrea Parker for many years, co-writing and producing her album Kiss My Arp and many of her other releases.

He has released four of his own albums: Tilted, Ghosts, Sanctum,
and The Origin of Storms.

References

Living people
1965 births
English male child actors
Male actors from London
20th-century English male actors